Articles related to the Canadian province of Alberta include:

0–9
.ab.ca – Internet second-level domain for the Province of Alberta.

A 
Alberta Act 1905
Alberta Alliance Party
Alberta First Party
Alberta Forest Products Association
Alberta Greens
Alberta Liberal Party
Alberta New Democratic Party
Alberta Party Political Association
Alberta Progressive Conservatives
Alberta separatism
Alberta's Rockies
Albertosaurus

B 
Barrington Griffiths Watch Company
Battle of Alberta

C 
Charter schools in Alberta
Calgary Region
Calgary Scientific Inc
Calgary True Buddha Pai Yuin Temple
Central Alberta
Clean Scene
Coat of Arms of Alberta

D

E 
Edmonton Metropolitan Region
Elections Alberta
Environmental issues in Alberta

F 
First Nations in Alberta
Flag of Alberta
Franco-Albertans

G 
Geography of Alberta
Green Party of Alberta (2011–present)

H  
History of Alberta
History of Edmonton
History of Lethbridge

I 
Inspiring Education: A Dialogue with Albertans
Industry in Alberta

J

K

L 
Legislative Assembly of Alberta
List of airports in Alberta
List of Alberta general elections
List of Alberta lieutenant-governors
List of Alberta premiers
List of census agglomerations in Alberta
List of census divisions of Alberta
List of communities in Alberta
List of cities in Alberta
List of designated places in Alberta
List of ghost towns in Alberta
List of hamlets in Alberta
List of Indian reserves in Alberta
List of lakes of Alberta
List of municipal districts in Alberta
List of municipalities in Alberta
List of population centres in Alberta
List of protected areas of Alberta
List of rivers of Alberta
List of school authorities in Alberta
List of settlements in Alberta
List of summer villages in Alberta
List of television stations in Alberta
List of towns in Alberta
List of universities in Alberta
List of villages in Alberta
Lubicon Lake (Cree) Indian Nation

M 
Métis in Alberta
Valentine Milvain
Ministry of Gaming (Alberta)
Mountains of Alberta

N 
Northern Alberta

O  
Old Strathcona

P 
Palliser's Triangle
Politics of Alberta

Q

R 
Representative Party of Alberta
Red Mile

S 
Same-sex marriage in Alberta
Separation Party of Alberta
Social Credit Party of Alberta
Socialist Party of Alberta
Southern Alberta
Special Areas Board
Specialized municipalities of Alberta
Symbols of Alberta

T 
TUXIS Parliament of Alberta

U 
United Farmers of Alberta
United Conservative Party
University of Alberta
University of Calgary

V 
Voice for Animals Humane Society

W

X

Y

Z

See also 

Topic overview:
Index of Canada-related articles
Alberta
Outline of Alberta

 
Alberta